First Girl I Loved is a 2016 American romantic drama film written and directed by Kerem Sanga. It stars Dylan Gelula, Brianna Hildebrand, Tim Heidecker and Pamela Adlon. The film premiered at the 2016 Sundance Film Festival and won the Audience Award for "Best of NEXT". The film follows two teenage girls, nerdy yearbook editor Anne and softball star Sasha, wrestling with their sexuality at a Los Angeles high school. It was released in the United States and Canada in select theaters and on demand October 18, 2016.

Plot
While watching a high school softball game, yearbook editor Anne falls for the team star Sasha. She confesses her realization to her best friend Clifton, who reacts badly due to his own feelings for Anne. He kisses Anne, and, after she initially pushes him away, Cliff initiates sex and Anne goes along with it though it is evident she is unwilling. She eventually pushes him away and tearfully expresses that her current crush is not a boy, as Clifton had assumed, but a girl. Clifton calls her a dyke and accuses her of leading him on.

Under the guise of yearbook interviews, Anne visits Sasha and the two begin to strike up a friendship. Their relationship grows over the upcoming weeks through their texting, culminating in Anne comforting Sasha after the latter causes her team to lose their big game.

Clifton continues to lash out at Anne in jealousy. When Anne discovers he broke her bike lock and caused it to be stolen, she attacks him during their yearbook class, causing her to receive disciplinary action from the school. Clifton remains engaged in his plan to sabotage Anne, ultimately asking out Sasha himself. However, he begins to regret his actions during a meeting with his guidance counselor.

After being reprimanded by the school and arguing with her mother, Anne goes on a hangout with Sasha and convinces her to let her sleep over at Sasha's house. That same night, the two sneak out to a bar and flirt with some men, but end up dancing with each other and kissing. Sasha is confused following their encounter, but lets Anne return home and the two share her bed.

The following day, Sasha refuses to speak to Anne and attempts dating Clifton, but he is accepted Anne dating her and mistakes Sasha's offer to be for him to be a beard. Anne tries unsuccessfully to resume her relationship with Sasha, even admitting her crush in public, but Sasha remains distant.

Growing hurt, Anne secretly includes a picture in the school yearbook of her and Sasha kissing. The swapped photo is printed in every yearbook, and the families of Clifton, Anne, and Sasha are called by the school to convene. There, Sasha asserts that the encounter in the photograph was non-consensual and depicted Anne taking advantage of her while she was drunk. Clifton, grappling with his own breach of Anne's consent, takes the blame for placing the photo in the yearbook and expresses how much of the student body knew the two were dating. Sasha ultimately concedes that she "doesn't know" if she hadn't or had consented. Anne and her mother then leave the meeting.

Later that day, Anne visits Jasmine, the owner of the bar and retail store where she and Sasha hung out, now to test herself for HIV. The two share a period of reflection over her history, in which Anne comments on another coercive sexual experience. Anne discuss her heartache over Sasha and accepts that she is gay. As she leaves, she sees her stolen bike in the shop window and reenters the store.

Cast
 Dylan Gelula as Anne Smith
 Brianna Hildebrand as Sasha Basanez
 Pamela Adlon as Sharon Sacopolus
 Mateo Arias as Clifton Martinez
 Tim Heidecker as Mr. Quibodeaux
 Cameron Esposito as Jasmine
 Jennifer Prediger as Assistant Principal Heather Wiggins
 Erik Griffin as Mr. Maldonado
 Ana Dela Cruz as Rita Basanez
 John Redlinger as Johnny Glasses

Critical reception
The film has received positive reviews and is currently 90% Fresh on Rotten Tomatoes. Toronto Star critic Peter Howell praised the "smouldering drama," saying "Sexual disorientation in high school makes for movie brilliance in this "Best of NEXT" audience award winner from Sundance 2016." Consequence of Sound critic Justin Gerber wrote: "What writer and director Kerem Sanga captures so well in First Girl I Loved is high school. What he captures even better is falling in love, or the naïve idea of what it means to be in love as a teenager." Bilge Ebiri of Vulture admired the way language, both spoken and unspoken, is used in the film, saying: "All around these kids swirls a matrix of communication: voice-over, multiple languages, text messages, innuendo, made-up diction, fake accents, even softball signals. Writer-director Kerem Sanga finds stylistic ways to express this diversity of speech." Variety critic Dennis Harvey favored the acting performances, but stated: "The results are more well intentioned than actually purposeful, but nonetheless slick and pacey enough to hold attention."  SLUGs Alexander Ortega praised the film's "nontraditional narrative structure" and commented: "The sensations that First Girl I Love generates through the fugue storytelling device, however, communicates their urgency and gravity." Collider critic Tommy Cooke described the film as "a collage of time-half-remembered," saying that "for a film that tackles such weighty subjects as consent & homophobia, First Girl I Loved never gets bogged down in melodrama. It's a kind film – heartfelt and empathetic – a memory more than earned."

Awards 
2016 Audience Award: Next at the 2016 Sundance Film Festival

References

External links
 

2016 films
2016 independent films
2016 LGBT-related films
2016 romantic drama films
2010s coming-of-age drama films
2010s high school films
American coming-of-age drama films
American high school films
American independent films
American romantic drama films
American teen LGBT-related films
American teen romance films
Films scored by John Swihart
Films set in Los Angeles
Lesbian-related films
LGBT-related coming-of-age films
LGBT-related romantic drama films
2010s English-language films
2010s American films